is a 1993 Japanese film directed by Akira Inoue. It is based on Kazuo Koike's manga series Lone Wolf and Cub. Masakazu Tamura played Ogami by Koike Kazuo's strong request. Koike produced the film on the theme of parent-child love, not action as with past Lone Wolf and Cub films and television drama series.

Plot
Set in Japan during an unspecific year of the Edo period, Ogami Ittō, a samurai serving the Tokugawa shogun as "Kogi Kaishaku-nin" (official executioner) is the target of a Yagyu clan conspiracy to grab his job and replace him with a member of their own family. When his wife is murdered and evidence appears to show that he is plotting against the Shogun, the Bushido code requires him to commit seppuku. Instead, he defies the Tokugawa Shogun's orders and picks up the sword with his young son against his enemies, becoming an assassin to hire.

Cast
 Masakazu Tamura as Ogami Ittō
 Tatsuya Nakadai as Yagyū Retsudō
 Yushi Shoda as Ogami Daigoro
 Isao Hashizume as Yagyū Bizen (Retsudō's younger brother)
 Shima Iwashita as Oharu (Prostitute)
 Kimiko Ikegami as Yagyū Chizuro (Yagyū Hyōgo's wife)
 Renji Ishibashi as Matsudaira Suo no Kami
  Chōichirō Kawarasaki as Nitani Kenmotsu 
 Hiroyuki Okita as Yagyū Hyōgo
 Hirotarō Honda as Samurai (Be executed by Ogami Ittō)
 Yūko Kotegawa Ogami's Wife
  Tōru Masuoka as Yagyū Kurando
 Junkichi Orimoto as Rōjū of Tokugawa shogunate
 Kunie Tanaka as Oshou
 Mayumi Wakamura as Yagyū Nanao (Retsudō's daughter)
 Shiho Fujimura as Shino

Other Credits
Executive producer
Yoshinobu Nishioka
Art Direction by
Yoshinobu Nishioka

Release
Lone Wolf and Cub: Final Conflict was released theatrically in Japan on 6 February 1993 where it was distributed by Shochiku.

Awards 
Japanese Academy Awards:
Best Supporting Actor: Kunie Tanaka

References

External links

Live-action films based on manga
Jidaigeki films
Samurai films
1
Films set in the Edo period
1990s Japanese films